is a train station in Ōji, Nara, Japan.

Lines
  JR-West
  Wakayama Line

Layout

External links
 Official website 

Railway stations in Japan opened in 1955
Railway stations in Nara Prefecture